Platytropius is a genus of schilbid catfishes native to Asia.  One species, P. siamensis is now considered to be extinct.

Species
There are currently two recognized species in this genus:
 †Platytropius siamensis (Sauvage, 1883)
 Platytropius yunnanensis He, Huang & Li, 1995

References

Schilbeidae
Horabagridae
Fish of Asia
Freshwater fish genera
Catfish genera
Taxa named by Sunder Lal Hora